S. Anand is an Indian author, publisher and journalist. He, along with D. Ravikumar, founded the publishing house Navayana in 2003, which is "India’s first and only publishing house to focus on the issue of caste from an anticaste perspective." Navayana won the British Council-London Book Fair International Young Publisher of the Year award in 2007. In Pali, the word "navayana" means "new vehicle". B. R. Ambedkar used the word in 1956 to describe the branch of Buddhism that wouldn't be mired in the Hinayana-Mahayana divide, but would help dalits gain equality in India.

S. Anand is an Ambedkarite and a Buddhist. S. Anand co-authored, with Srividya Natarajan, and illustrators Durgabai Vyam and Suresh Vyam, the hugely popular graphic novel Bhimayana: Experiences of Untouchability on the life of B. R. Ambedkar, Indian polymath, social reformer and the architect of the Indian Constitution. He has also annotated Ambedkar's classic Annihilation of Caste; the annotated edition has an introductory essay by Arundhati Roy titled "The Doctor and the Saint".

Before starting Navayana, Anand was a journalist with Outlook and Tehelka. He is married to R. Sivapriya who works with Penguin India.

References

External links 
Excerpt from Roy's essay, "The Doctor and the Saint"
“We didn’t think of ourselves as a publishing company which will churn out books for the market” - in conversation with S. Anand on GraphicShelf

Indian publishers (people)
Indian male writers
Indian Buddhists
Indian male journalists
Year of birth missing (living people)
Living people